Lev Shcheglov (28 August 1946 – 11 December 2020) was a Russian physician who focused on sexology and psychotherapy.

Biography
Shcheglov was considered the leading authority on sexological matters in Russia. He published 230 scientific works, among them 20 monographs and textbooks.

He died from COVID-19 during the COVID-19 pandemic in Russia. He is buried in St. Petersburg at the Preobrazhenskoye Jewish cemetery.

Publications 
 In English

 In Russian
 Щеглов Л. Записки сексолога. — Амфора, 2009. — 
 Щеглов Л. Всё про секс: от А до Я. — Амфора, Ред Фиш, 2005. — 
 Щеглов Л., Билич Г. Мужская сексуальность. — Новая Волна, Умеренков, 2004. — , 
 Щеглов Л. Энциклопедия секса, или 1001 ночь с доктором Щегловым. — Алетейя, 2002. — 
 Щеглов Л., Фрай М. Книга извращений. — Амфора, 2002. —  [23]
 Щеглов Л. Лабиринты плоти или история болезни мадам Елены. — ЛИК, 2000. — 
 Щеглов Л. Сексология и сексопатология. Врачу и пациенту. — Культ-информ-пресс, 1998. — 
 Щеглов Л. Не только о сексе. — Комплект, 1997. — 
 Щеглов Л. Неврозы и сексуальные расстройства. — 1996.
 Щеглов Л. Яблоко доктора Щеглова, или Что осталось за кадром. — АРТ-Пресс, 1995. — 
 Щеглов Л. Доктор Щеглов о сексе. — Фирма «Латона», 1995. — 
 Щеглов Л. Сексология. Врачу и пациенту. — СПб.: Олма-Пресс, 2001. — 384 с. — 3000 экз. — , 
 Щеглов Л. Групповая ненависть как двигатель новейшей истории / Русский имаго 2000. Исследования по психоанализу культуры. СПб., 2001, с. 114-116.
 Щеглов Л. Некоторые аспекты психоаналитического подхода в сексологической практике. // Вопросы сексологии. СПб., 1992, с. 70-72.
 Щеглов Л. Психосоматическая модель сексуальных расстройств. СПб., 1993. - 32 с.
 Щеглов Л. Психосоматические соотношения и психоанализ. / Вопросы психоанализа. СПб., 1993, с. 76-89.
 Щеглов Л. Эрос в зеркале культуры / Русский имаго 2001. Исследования по психоанализу культуры. СПб., 2002, с. 243-251.
 Щеглов Л. Лабиринты страсти.
 Щеглов Л. Андрогин.

References

External links

  Russian experts on sexology: Lev Shcheglov 

1946 births
2020 deaths
Russian Jews
Russian sexologists
Physicians from Saint Petersburg
Deaths from the COVID-19 pandemic in Russia